Oenothera rosea, also known as rosy evening-primrose, rose evening primrose, pink evening primrose, or Rose of Mexico, is a plant belonging to the genus Oenothera and native to northern Mexico and Texas.

Oenothera rosea has flowers with less than  diameter. The shade varies from pink to red.

References

External links
Jepson Manual Treatment
Photo gallery

rosea
Plants described in 1789
Flora of Bolivia
Flora of Costa Rica
Flora of Ecuador
Flora of Guatemala
Flora of Mexico
Flora of Peru
Flora of Texas
Night-blooming plants
Flora of North America